Frontier Mountain is a large, mainly ice-free mountain,  high, situated  south-southeast of Roberts Butte of the Outback Nunataks, Victoria Land, and  west-northwest of the Sequence Hills, near the edge of the featureless, interior ice plateau of Antarctica. It was named by the northern party of the New Zealand Geological Survey Antarctic Expedition, 1962–63, because of its geographical location. This mountain lies situated on the Pennell Coast, a portion of Antarctica lying between Cape Williams and Cape Adare.

References

Mountains of Victoria Land
Pennell Coast